East Fork Pacheco Creek is a 5 mile long tributary stream of North Fork Pacheco Creek in the Diablo Range in Santa Clara County, California.

References 

Rivers of Santa Clara County, California
Diablo Range